12th Street may refer to:

Roads
12th Street (Chicago), now Roosevelt Road
12th Street (Erie, Pennsylvania)
12th Street (Manhattan)
12th Street (St. Louis)
12th Street (Washington, D.C.)
New Jersey Route 54, known locally as 12th Street

Transit
12th Street (GRTC BRT station)
12th Street station (DART), in Dallas, Texas, USA
12th Street/Jefferson and 12th Street/Washington stations, Valley Metro Rail stations in Phoenix, Arizona, USA
12th Street Oakland City Center station, a BART station in Oakland, California, USA

See also
12th Avenue (disambiguation)